The following is the squad list for the 2017 FIFA U-20 World Cup. Each squad consisted of 21 players in total, three of whom had to be goalkeepers.

Players name marked in bold have been capped at full international level.

Group A

South Korea
Head coach:  Shin Tae-yong

Guinea
Head coach:  Mandiou Diallo

Argentina
Head coach:  Claudio Úbeda

England
On 19 May, Ezri Konsa replaced injured Rico Henry.

Head coach:  Paul Simpson

Group B

Venezuela
Head coach:  Rafael Dudamel

Germany
Head coach:  Guido Streichsbier

Vanuatu
Head coach:  Dejan Gluščević

Mexico
Head coach:  Marco Antonio Ruiz

Group C

Zambia
Head coach:  Beston Chambeshi

Portugal
On 2 May 2017, Portugal announced their 21-man final list. On 9 May, Hélder Ferreira replaced the injured Aurélio Buta.

Head coach:  Emílio Peixe

Iran
Head coach:  Amir Hossein Peiravani

Costa Rica
Head coach:  Marcelo Herrera

Group D

South Africa
On 17 May, Sirgio Kammies replaced the injured Phakamani Mahlambi.

Head Coach:  Thabo Senong

Japan
Head coach:  Atsushi Uchiyama

Italy
Head coach:  Alberigo Evani

Uruguay
Head coach:  Fabián Coito

Group E

France
On 21 May, Faitout Maouassa replaced injured Ronaël Pierre-Gabriel.

Head coach:  Ludovic Batelli

Honduras
Head coach:  Carlos Tábora

Vietnam
Head coach:  Hoàng Anh Tuấn

New Zealand
Head coach:  Darren Bazeley

Group F

Ecuador
Head coach:  Javier Rodríguez

United States
On 17 May, Auston Trusty replaced the injured Marlon Fossey.

Head Coach:  Tab Ramos

Saudi Arabia
Head Coach:  Saad Al-Shehri

Senegal
Head Coach:  Joseph Koto

References

External links
Teams at FIFA.com
Official site at FIFA.com

FIFA U-20 World Cup squads
2017 FIFA U-20 World Cup